Sweetune is a South Korean music producer team, originally consisting of Han Jae-ho and Kim Seung-soo, and now including nine other members. They have produced many hit songs and albums for Korean idols and Japanese idols, including Kara, Rainbow, Infinite, Nine Muses, Boyfriend and Spica. Sweetune is known for their 1980s-style synth-pop and disco sound.

Team members
The Sweetune team includes music producers, composers, songwriters and engineers.

Current members

Han Jae-ho (founder)
Kim Seung-soo (founder)
Song Soo-yoon
Lee Chang-hyun
Go Nam-soo
Go Myung-jae
Ahn Joon-sung
Jung Byung-kyu
Han Bo-ram
Hong Seung-hyun
Yue Kim

Former members
Before debuting with Spica, Kim Boa worked for Sweetune as a vocal coach, and also recorded background vocals and guide vocals. In 2014, three team members (Lee Joo-hyung, Hwang Hyun and G-High) left Sweetune and formed their own music production team, MonoTree.

Production discography

2008
Kara – Rock U and Pretty Girl

2009
Kara – Pretty Girl Special Edition and Revolution
Rainbow – Gossip Girl
A'st1 - Dynamite

2010
Aira Mitsuki - "LOVE Re:"
Brown Eyed Girls – "Magic"
Infinite – First Invasion
Kara – Lupin and Jumping

2011
Baby Soul ft. Wheesung – "Stranger"
Boyfriend – "Don't Touch My Girl" and "I'll Be There"
bump.y – "Kiss!" and "New Day"
f(x) – "Love" from Pinocchio
Heo Young-saeng – "Let It Go" from Let It Go
Idoling!!! – "Shōjo no Jidai Kara" from Sisters and Yarakai Heart
Infinite – Evolution, Inspirit and Over the Top
Kara – Step
Nine Muses - Figaro
Rainbow – So Girls

2012
Beast – "Hateful Person" from Big OST
Boyfriend – Love Style, Janus and "My Lady"
Dramatic Blue – "Tearfully Beautiful"
Infinite – Infinitize
Kara – Pandora
Nine Muses – Sweet Rendezvous
Spica – "Russian Roulette" and "Lonely"
D-Date – "Catch A Train"

2013
Boyfriend – Seventh Mission
Heo Young-saeng – She
Infinite – New Challenge
Kara – Full Bloom
Nine Muses – "Dolls", Wild, Prima Donna and "Glue"
Yoo Ji-ae – "Delight"

2014
Boyfriend – Witch
Infinite – Season 2
Nicole – First Romance
Spica – "Ghost"
Stellar – Marionette and "Mask"

2015
Romeo – "Lovesick" and "Target"
Snuper – "Shall We Dance"
Nicole - Something Special

2016
Snuper – "Platonic Love", "Compass" and "Rain of Mind" 
100% – "Time Leap"
A.DE – Good Time
Nicole - Don't Stop
Nicole - Happy
Nicole - Lunar

2017
Lovelyz – "Emotion" and "The"
100% – "Sketchbook"
Snuper – "Hide and Seek", "Back:Hug", "My Girl's Fox" and "The Star of Stars (유성)"
Top Secret – "Time's Up", "She", "Something Special", "Can't Wait", "Mind Control", "Dumb" and "Up&Down"
Target – "Tempest", "Atsui Omoi"
Pick A Green (초록픽하나) from The Unit: Idol Rebooting Project – "내꺼 (You're Mine)"
Weki Meki – "i-Teen Girls Special"

2018
Infinite – "Pray (Maetal's Sorrow)" 
Target – "Still", "Awake" and "Afterwards" 
Golden Child – "Miracle", "It's U" and "Lady"
Lovelyz – "Heal", "That Day" and "Lost N Found"
Top Secret – "Love Story", "Paradise" 
SNUPER – "Like Star"

2019
Target – "Beautiful"
IZ – "EDEN"
TST – "Wake Up"
Goo Hara - Midnight Queen (EP)

2020
IZ – THE:IZ
JEONG MIN - REWIND
KEEMBO – Scandalous, 99, Scene

2021
KEEMBO – Scandal, Whatever

2022
Sanha - HELLO
 RoaD-B - Nonstop (Co-writers: Choi Yunho and Song Sooyoon)
CSR - "Euratcha!"

Notes

References

External links

South Korean record producers
South Korean songwriters